Charlie Higgins (born Charles Robert Higginson; 23 July 1892 – 5 February 1978) was a British comedian. While largely forgotten today, he was one of the most popular British comedians of the early 1930s.

Biography
He was born in Ancoats, Manchester (though some sources erroneously give Liverpool). His father worked in the iron works, whilst Charlie and his sister both started work in a  cotton mill at a young age.  After service in the First World War, Charlie became part of a double act with his wartime colleague Charles Robert St Juste, and were known as The King's Jesters.  They toured the music halls, their act including singing, whistling and comedy.

The double act broke up in 1925  but Higgins continued to be successful alone, and toured the country in revues with a combination of comic acting and singing.  A review from the Portsmouth Evening News in 1926 said: "Charlie Higgins is a new type of comedian who does not rely upon jokes of doubtful character to provoke laughter but who abounds in witticisms which are really funny."   His most successful revue was Out of Work in 1926, a show written for him by fellow comedian Billy Bennett, and in which Higgins played a shop worker who lost his job and tried but failed at various other occupations.

He established himself as a comedian from about 1930, billed as "A fool if only he knew it", and with a distinctive costume of top hat, plus-fours and brown boots.  He often performed with a sidekick, such as Bert Bray (1886–1938), as a double act.  In his day he played the part of someone who is down in their luck. He was a master of facial expressions.

His first recording, "With Me Gloves In Me 'And", was made in 1930.   He was a popular recording comedian from the early to the mid-1930s.   In the 1930s Higgins released at least twenty records, mostly on the Broadcast label and the last few on the Rex label.  Despite lack of modern recognition, he was a very successful recording comedian and performed at an All Star Non Stop Variety Show in 1934.  He played at the London Palladium three times in the 1930s and also appeared on radio, and on the TV programmes Variety, Cabaret and Comedy Cabaret in 1938.

He retired in the early 1950s to his home in Mill Hill, north west London, and died on 5 February 1978.  In his obituary, The Stage described him as having a "unique style".

His recordings were later released on CD.

List of songs
With Me Gloves in Me 'And, me hat on one side (1930) – This was his first record and most successful.
In The Waxworks Late Last Night (1930) 
Down In The Field Where the Buttercups All Grow (1931)
Running Up and Down our street (1931)
The Girls of the old brigade (1931)
Sh! There's a Ghost In The House (1931)
Down In The Old Churchyard (1931)
Charlie's Saxophone (1931)
I'm a daddy at 63 (1931)
Charlie In Spain (1931)
The Day I went to Wembley for the Cup-Tie (1931)
Maggie and me and the baby (1931)
With Me Bagful of nuts and Some sweets in my Mouth (1932)
Jolly Old Uncle Joe (1932)
Mrs. McGrath and Mrs. O'Rafferty (1932)
Charlie Goes Shopping on Saturday Night (1932)
Bumpity Bump Again (1932)
Round at her mother's on Sunday (1932)
That's why women were born (1932)
When I was twenty-one (1932)
Mother's walking around in Father's Trousers (1933)
Where The Violets are blue-oo and the roses are red (1933)
Charlie Makes Whoopee! (1933)-Also featuring Bert Bray
Charlie's Breach and Promise case (1933)-Also featuring Bert Bray
All Poshed up with me Daises in my hand (1934)
Navvies' Jazz (1934)

References

Further reading
Sculthorpe, Derek The Lost World of Music Hall (2021) Bear Manor Media

External links
 Charlie Higgins - All Poshed Up - Windyridge VAR34
 
 Listen to 'When I Was Twenty-One'

English male comedians
1892 births
1978 deaths
Comedians from Manchester
Music hall performers
20th-century English comedians